This is a list of mayors of East Chicago, Indiana. East Chicago was incorporated as a town in 1889, and became a city in 1893.

References

East Chicago, Indiana
East Chicago, Indiana
1893 establishments in Indiana